The  was a Bo-Bo wheel arrangement electric locomotive that operated in Japan from 1922.

The two locomotives in the class were designed and built by Westinghouse Electric (electrical components) and Baldwin (mechanical components) in 1922. Originally designated "Class 1000", the locomotives were reclassified ED10 in 1928. The unit has a Bo-Bo wheel arrangement and is powered by four DC traction motors producing a total of 1,100 horsepower.

Preserved examples
Following its withdrawal in 1960, ED10 2 was sold to the Seibu Railway, where it became number E71. It was operated until 1986, after which it was preserved at Yokoze Depot and returned to its original JNR-era livery.

See also
 Japan Railways locomotive numbering and classification

References

Railway locomotives introduced in 1922
Electric locomotives of Japan
1500 V DC locomotives
Bo-Bo locomotives
Kawasaki locomotives
1067 mm gauge locomotives of Japan
Preserved electric locomotives